(April 4, 1928 – December 11, 2001) was a Japanese ski jumper who competed in the early 1950s. He finished 27th in the individual large hill event at the 1952 Winter Olympics in Oslo.

References

Ski jumpers at the 1952 Winter Olympics
Japanese male ski jumpers
2001 deaths
1928 births
Olympic ski jumpers of Japan